Neus Garriga Turón (born 18 October 1978) is a Spanish former sailor, who specialized in the Europe class. She competed for the nation's sailing squad in two editions of the Olympic Games (2000 and 2004), and came closest to the medal haul on her Olympic debut in Sydney, trailing behind the bronze medalist Serena Amato of Argentina. Garriga trained throughout most of her sailing career for El Balís Nautical Club ( in the outskirts of Barcelona.

Garriga made her Olympic debut in Sydney 2000, sailing in the Europe class. There, she scored a career best result in the sixth heat with a momentous lead over the rest of the fleet, but a black flag disqualification from the last of eleven races dropped Garriga out of medal contention to fourth overall, with a net total of 61 points.

At the 2004 Summer Olympics in Athens, Garriga qualified for her second Spanish team in the Europe class by placing twelfth and receiving a berth from the 2003 ISAF World Championships in Cadiz. Unlike her previous Olympics, Garriga could not compensate from an early surge in the opening to climb again on top of the rankings, as she finished thirteenth out of twenty-five sailors in the overall leaderboard, posting a final net grade of 108.

Notes

References

External links
 
 
 

1978 births
Living people
Spanish female sailors (sport)
Olympic sailors of Spain
Sailors at the 2000 Summer Olympics – Europe
Sailors at the 2004 Summer Olympics – Europe
Sportspeople from Barcelona